Germanenzug (WAB 70) is a secular, patriotic cantata composed in 1863–1864 by Anton Bruckner on a text by August Silberstein.

History 
After the completion of Psalm 112, Bruckner composed Germanenzug in July 1863. It is the first major example of occasional pieces set to secular texts Bruckner would write throughout his career for the Liedertafeln.

Bruckner entered it for a competition at the first , scheduled for August 1864 in Linz. Bruckner's original intention was to use the Zigeuner-Waldlied, a lost work (WAB 135), as basis for this entry, but after correspondence with Silberstein and his close friend Rudolf Weinwurm, Bruckner replaced it with the patriotic poem of the Viennese poet and journalist August Silberstein.

During the spring of 1864, the festival was postponed. It was rescheduled for 4–6 June 1865, and renamed . Bruckner fine-tuned his composition till August 1864 before submission. Bruckner's and Weinwurm's entries were two of the eight compositions chosen to proceed to the final stages. The eight selected compositions were issued in the same year by Josef Kränzl, Ried.

At the festival the Liedertafel Frohsinn performed Germanenzug under Bruckner's baton on 5 June. Germanenzug was awarded second prize. The winning composition was Weinwurm's Germania.

Thirty years later, in 1893, Bruckner would compose a second secular cantata on a text by Silberstein, Helgoland (WAB 71) which would become Bruckner's last completed work. That Bruckner valued Germanenzug is shown by his request that the middle section be performed as part of observances after his death.

Text 

The work uses a text by August Silberstein:

At the end of the first page of his manuscript Bruckner added the following text:
 Freya:  (the goddess of love in the full-of-light heaven);
 Solgofnir:  (the cock with the golden comb, which calls the morning and wakes up the heroes);
 Braga:  (the god of poetry and arts);
 Balmung:  (Sigurd's sword); Balmungschlag:  (sword clang);
 Odin:  (the chief god);
 Walkyren:  (the winged maidens, who lead heroes into battle, and souls to heaven).

Setting 
The 118-bar work in D minor is scored for  male-voice choir, male solo quartet, and brass ensemble (two cornets, four trumpets, four horns, a baritone horn (Tenorhorn) or Euphonium, three trombones, and a bass tuba). Duration: about 8 minutes.

Structurally the cantata consists of three main sections, each with internal repetition. The outer sections portray German warriors going into battle, and the middle section is a song of the Valkyries who describe the delight of Valhalla, the destination of heroes who are killed in battle. The "A-B-A" structure is topped off with a coda.

The first section (36 bars), "Germanen durchschreiten des Urwaldes Nacht", is in D minor. The sharply dotted leaping octave motive at the beginning is a slightly altered variant of the Festive cantata Preiset den Herrn. The slower middle section (39 bars), "In Odins Hallen ist es licht", is the most adventurous harmonically. It features reduced forces of a solo male quartet and the four horns. A solo horn leads from the quartet without pause in the third section (43 bars), "Da schlagen die Krieger mit wilder Gewalt", which begins with a repetition of the first section. Thereafter it proceeds to D major and new material for the stirring coda ("Die Freiheit, die Heimat ja ewig bestehn").

The mature Bruckner style is already present. The strongly-dotted rhythms which accent the brass writing in the first section prefigure passages in Bruckner's Symphony No. 1 and later symphonic works. The use of the key of D minor is an early instance of his special preference for this tonality, which is shared with the Requiem, the Mass No. 1 and three symphonies: "No. 0", No. 3 and the valedictory No. 9.

Harmonic usage is fully nineteenth-century, centred around root progressions and key contrasts in thirds. Particularly in the second part, substantial passages appear where no more than a few chords can be analyzed in any one key. The instruments are more independent of the voices than in previous works in this genre by Bruckner. While they continue to double and support the choir, they also add extra harmony and contrapuntal lines, and contribute substantially to the effectiveness of the tone painting.

Discography 
There are a few recordings of Germanenzug:
 Robert Shewan, Roberts Wesleyan College Chorale and Brass Ensemble, Choral Works of Anton Bruckner – CD: Albany TROY 063, 1991
 Attila Nagy, Universitätssängerschaft 'Barden zu Wien', Men's choir of Vienna and Hungarian Brass Ensemble, Anton Bruckner und seine Zeit – CD: Disc-Lazarus DL-USB 8B, 18 May 1996
  Attila Nagy, Universitätssängerschaft 'Barden zu Wien', Men's choirs of Vienna and Musikverein Hörsching, Konzert im Brucknerjahr – CD: Disc-Lazarus DL-USB 8D, 26 October 1996

Nagy recorded Germanenzug two other times with the same choir and piano accompaniment, instead of brass ensemble: 
 Bruckner-Festabend anlässlich des 100. Todestages von Ehrenmitglied Anton Bruckner – CD: Disc-Lazarus DL-USB 8C, 7 June 1996
 Im Denken treu, im Liede deutsch – CD: Disc-Lazarus DL-USB 26, between 1997 and 2007
Note Germanezug has been performed at the Brucknerfest 2022 (Brucknerfest 2022 - Krieg und Frieden (29-09-2022)). A recording is available in the Bruckner Archive.

See also 
Arminius (Bruch)
Helgoland (Bruckner)

References

Sources 
 Anton Bruckner – Sämtliche Werke, Band XXII/2: Kantaten und Chorwerke II (1862–1893), Musikwissenschaftlicher Verlag der Internationalen Bruckner-Gesellschaft, Franz Burkhart, Rudolf H. Führer and Leopold Nowak (Editor), Vienna, 1987 (Available on IMSLP: Neue Gesamtausgabe, XXII/2. Kantaten und Chorwerke Teil 2: Nr. 6-8)
 John Proffitt, booklet of the CD: R. Shewan, Choral Works of Anton Bruckner, 1991
 Uwe Harten, Anton Bruckner. Ein Handbuch. , Salzburg, 1996. .
 John Williamson, The Cambridge companion to Bruckner, Cambridge University Press, 2004. 
 Keith William Kinder, The wind and wind-chorus music of Anton Bruckner, Greenwood Press, Westport CT, 2000. 
 Cornelis van Zwol, Anton Bruckner - Leven en Werken, Thot, Bussum (Netherlands), 2012. 
 Crawford Howie, Anton Bruckner - A documentary biography, online revised edition

External links 
 
Germanenzug d-Moll, WAB 70 Critical discography by Hans Roelofs  

Cantatas by Anton Bruckner
1864 compositions
German patriotic songs